Heartbeat is a British police procedural period drama series, based upon the "Constable" series of novels written by Nicholas Rhea, and produced by ITV Studios (formerly Yorkshire Television until it was merged by ITV) from 1992 until 2010. The series is set during the 1960s around real-life and fictional locations within the North Riding of Yorkshire, with most episodes focused on stories that usually are separate but sometimes intersect with one another; in some episodes, a singular story takes place focused on a major incident.

The programme initially starred Nick Berry, Niamh Cusack, Derek Fowlds, William Simons, Mark Jordon, and Bill Maynard, but as more main characters were added to the series, additional actors included Jason Durr, Jonathan Kerrigan, Philip Franks, Duncan Bell, Clare Wille, Lisa Kay, Tricia Penrose, Geoffrey Hughes, Peter Benson and Gwen Taylor. Production of episodes involved filming of outdoor and exterior scenes around the North Riding, including in and around Whitby and Goathland, with interior scenes filmed at The Leeds Studios.

Heartbeat proved popular from the beginning, when early series consistently drew over 10 million viewers, achieving a peak audience of 13.82 million in 2001, and 12.8 million viewers in 2003. Its success eventually led to a spin-off series, titled The Royal, as well as a special episode, and three documentaries. In June 2010, ITV announced the cancellation of Heartbeat after its eighteenth series, following discussions on its future.

Premise

Heartbeat is a period drama set within the North Riding of Yorkshire during 1960s. Plots for each episode take place within both the fictional village of Aidensfield and the fictional town of Ashfordly, as well as several other fictional villages and farms in the surrounding moors and countryside. On occasions, plots also include the real-life town of Whitby. Each episode in the series focuses on a set of at least one or two main storylines and a side story, some or all of which would cross over with each other and influence the outcome of their plots. Political tones for storylines, coinciding with the decade the programme was set in, were rarely featured in episodes, though some episodes featured occasional references to the counterculture movement, while others would sometimes delve into a dramatic single storyline concerning a major incident that characters would deal with and sometimes be affected by.

The programme's title was chosen by writers to represent the series' key characters who worked as police officers and medical staff  "heart" for the medical themes featured regularly in the programme; and "beat" based on the phrase "the bobby's beat" ("bobby" being British slang for a police officer (from Robert Peel)). Each episode's set of storylines were inspired by those created for the Constable series of books, written by Nicholas Rhea (the pen-name of former policeman Peter Walker), which were focused on a police constable in the 1960s who came to Aidensfield, in order to serve the local community and solve crimes that took place on his new patch. Much of the characters and locations in the Constable series were directly used for creating the setting and plots in Heartbeat, under guidance from Rhea.

The series was originally intended as a launch platform for actor Nick Berry, following his involvement on the BBC's soap drama EastEnders, who alongside actress Niamh Cusack, were the prominent main actors of the programme for its first two series. Storylines mainly focused around both their characters, as they offered aid to those around the village and beyond, though the tone of plots was portrayed with grittiness and social realism. From the third series onwards, the role of the village policeman continued to be central to the storyline, but supporting actors were redefined as the programme's main cast, with their characters elevated in presence, effectively evolving Heartbeat into an ensemble drama that was themed as more cosy and comfortable compared to more modern TV police dramas. The changes were more notable by how supporting actors gained more prominence in the opening titles after being elevated into the series' main cast  up until the fifth series, both Berry and Cusack were prominently featured in the opening credits, but this changed in later series so that by the beginning of the seventh series, all actors in the main cast were given proper credit for their involvement in the drama series.

After the fifth series, storylines became less centralized around the village constable, focusing on separate storylines that retained a set structure within episodes: one focusing on a crime solved by the village constable and his colleagues at Ashfordly police; one focused on a medical issue that the village doctor and/or nurse would treat; and a side story focused on the programme's "lovable rogue" character which mainly was designed as comic relief, but sometimes featured light-hearted plots delving into heart-warming moments. In addition, over-arching storylines covering several episodes or even series, provided sub-plots between main characters, allowing for character and relationship development between them, with additional characters added in over time. In time, Heartbeat saw the cast being changed throughout its broadcast history, as new characters were introduced to replace those who left the show after being written out.

Sixties pop music features prominently in episodes, notably from the Beatles and Chuck Berry, forming the backbone of Heartbeats soundtrack, although music from other decades sometimes is played in episodes. Some 1970s records appear anachronistically, such as the Hollies' 1974 song "The Air That I Breathe", Led Zeppelin's "Black Dog" (1971) or Pink Floyd's 1971 instrumental "One of These Days." The series 17 finale "You Never Can Tell" is accompanied by the Flying Pickets' 1983 song "Only You", an episode which featured a guest appearance by the band's lead singer Brian Hibbard.

Episodes

Special programmes
The following is a list of specials made for Heartbeat, most of which were behind-the-scene documentaries. All were later included in DVD boxsets for specific series of the programme:

 Changing Places (13 June 1999) - A one-off special, starring Nick Berry and Juliette Gruber who reprised their roles as Nick and Joanna Rowan respectively. The episode focused on life for the Rowans after moving to Canada, and Nick's new job as a member of the Royal Canadian Mounted Police. The episode was filmed and released on video in 1998, before its television debut a year later.
 10 Years of Heartbeat (14 April 2002): A documentary special to celebrate the programme's tenth anniversary. Past and present members of the cast and crew, along with celebrity guests, recalled their experiences of the show and reviewed their favourite moments from the previous ten years.
 Heartbeat: Christmas Album (18 December 2005): A special that looked back at the Christmas episodes created for Heartbeat.
 Heartbeat: Farewell Phil (24 December 2007): A one-off special, commemorating the departure of actor Mark Jordon from the programme, after performing for seventeen series as the character Phil Bellamy. Both the actor and his former colleagues relive moments from the series featuring Jordon's character.

Production

Cast

Filming

The series was filmed at various locations around North Yorkshire. These include shots on the moors and frequent mentions of local roads (like the A171.) Exterior scenes of Aidensfield are filmed in the village of Goathland in North Yorkshire, with the village's railway station also appearing occasionally. Other prominent filming locations include Whitby, Otley and Scarborough. The "Heartbeat: Changing Places" special includes location filming in Canada and in series 18, two episodes were filmed on location in Queensland, Australia.

Broadcast
When Heartbeat first began on 10 April 1992 it aired on Fridays at 9.00 pm (on the ITV Network) but from series 2 it was moved to Sunday evenings in the 7.00 pm or 8.00 pm timeslot. All Heartbeat episodes are around 42–51 minutes long (one hour with adverts). The opening episode of Series 11 was planned to be the show's first two-hour episode, but it was eventually split into a two-part story, "Sweet Sixteen" and "She's Leaving Home". In 1994 a one-off feature-length episode was filmed, starring Lloyd Owen as constable Tom Merriweather.

Heartbeat repeats have appeared on ITV during the summer months (often billed on-screen as "Classic Heartbeat"), typically at 5.00 pm or, in 2006, at 4.00 pm. In 2006, episodes from the first few series were repeated again. Most of the swearing ("bloody", "bastard", etc.) and violence that was present in the early episodes was edited out for these daytime broadcasts.

For several years (as of 2016) Heartbeat reruns from series 11–18 have shown on ITV3, formerly in the original two-commercial-break format and latterly with three breaks. These repeats run daily each weekday lunchtime, with a second airing in an early-evening timeslot. Episodes from different series were shown on ITV3 at weekends.

As of Autumn 2015, series 1–10 of Heartbeat is being aired on the new ITV Encore channel, which is only available on the Sky TV platform (until ITV Encore ceased broadcasting). These episodes were broadcast at a time when ITV had two commercial breaks and therefore have a running time of around 50 minutes. However ITV Encore has 60-minute programme slots which include three commercial breaks, so some scenes are edited or have been completely removed, purely for timing reasons. An example of this was the series 7 episode 22 "Unconsidered Trifles", in which the scene with PC Mike Bradley and Bernie Scripps herding cows back into the farm shed was completely omitted.

Since ITV Encore's closure in 2018, all series of Heartbeat now air on ITV3.

Home media

Reception

Ratings

Ratings slowly declined after series 13. The schedule was split in half to incorporate the launch of The Royal from Series 12. Series 1 and 2 (1992–1993) aired between April and June, Series 3–6 (1993–1996) moved to the autumn schedule between September and December when there were either 10 or 16 episodes per series. Series 7–11 (1997–2002), comprising 24 episodes, aired between September and March.

Awards
 1995 – ITV Programme of the Year (TRIC Award) – Won
 1998 – ITV Programme of the Year – Won
 1998 – ITV Programme of the Year – National Television Award – Most Popular Newcomer (Jason Durr) – Nominated
 1999 – Best Performing Peak-Time Drama (ratings higher than Coronation Street and Who Wants to Be a Millionaire?) – Won
 2007 – Best European Drama (voted by Norwegian viewers) – Won
 2008 – Best Drama (nominated by ITV Studios along with The Royal and Emmerdale) – Won

The Royal

The ITV medical drama series The Royal was originally a spin-off from Heartbeat, with the twelfth-series Heartbeat episode "Out of the Blue" serving as an introductory pilot for the show, with the Aidensfield police officers conducting parts of their investigations in "The Royal" hospital. The series initially had close ties with Heartbeat, and several Heartbeat characters made an appearance. Over time, however, the crossovers were dropped and The Royal developed its own identity.

Cancellation
On 5 June 2001, ITV planned cutbacks for dramas such as London's Burning, Heartbeat and Peak Practice to make room for new commissions which could have seen the programme's demise. A spokesman said "The temptation is to just cancel long running shows. But if you do that you can spend years trying to find replacements that achieve the same viewing figures."

Kathleen Beedles, the new producer as of series 18, originally said Heartbeat was expected to continue until at least series 20 (at the time scheduled for 2010–11). However, it was announced on 28 January 2009 that production of both Heartbeat and its spin off show The Royal would be suspended for an unspecified period of time so that a large backlog of unbroadcast episodes could be cleared. Some newspaper reports interpreted this as meaning the show would be permanently cancelled. A report in The Telegraph suggested Heartbeat may return in "a new lower budget form".

In March 2009 a meeting to discuss the future of the show took place between ITV bosses and Heartbeat cast and crew members. The mood after the meeting was reportedly pessimistic about the show's long-term survival. Actor Steven Blakeley, who plays PC Younger, said the cast were to be released after series 18, indicating the show had been cancelled and filming had finished.

News of the show's alleged cancellation prompted protests from Heartbeat fans around the world as well as from communities in the Yorkshire Television region where the series was filmed and where the Heartbeat-themed tourist trade is seen as an important part of the local economy.

In January 2010, rumours were published that Sky might buy Heartbeat from ITV and take over its production. In February 2010, it was reported that Adam Crozier, the newly appointed ITV chief executive, would be responsible for making the decision about the future of the show. In March 2010, a survey was carried out by the Whitby Gazette, a newspaper local to the area in which the show is set, asking "Do you think that popular ITV show Heartbeat should be axed after 16 years?" 71% of respondents voted "No", 19% voted "Yes" and 10% voted "Don't Care".

Series 18 was unusually protracted. Filming ran from May 2008 to May 2009. It premiered on 12 October 2008 and took a break after the sixth episode, then continued from 19 April 2009 to 14 June 2009. The last nine episodes were shown between 18 July 2010 and 12 September 2010 in the UK, but in Sweden on TV4 from 25 August 2009 to 4 September 2009, and in Denmark on TV2 Charlie from 16 December 2009 to 24 December 2009. As at 3 November 2021, Heartbeat continues to be aired on TVO, Toronto, Ontario, Canada.

During the period of uncertainty about the show's future, ITV continued to maintain that reports of the show being "axed" were untrue, saying that production was "taking a rest" so that stockpiled episodes could be aired. However, on 25 June 2010, ITV finally confirmed that the show would be cancelled after series 18, with a spokesman saying "Heartbeat has been an important part of the television landscape over the last 18 years and we are incredibly proud of what it achieved in its heyday as one of ITV1's top rated dramas".

References

External links

Backgrounder on Heartbeat origins in the Nicholas Rhea "Constable" series

 
1992 British television series debuts
2010 British television series endings
1990s British crime drama television series
1990s British police procedural television series
1990s British workplace drama television series
2000s British crime drama television series
2000s British police procedural television series
2000s British workplace drama television series
2010s British crime drama television series
2010s British police procedural television series
2010s British workplace drama television series
English-language television shows
ITV television dramas
Television series by ITV Studios
Television series by Yorkshire Television
Television series set in the 1960s
Television shows based on British novels
Television shows set in Yorkshire